The 2014–15 Wake Forest Demon Deacons women's basketball team will represent Wake Forest University during the 2014–15 college basketball season. Jen Hoover resumes the responsibility as head coach for a third consecutive season. The Demon Deacons are members of the Atlantic Coast Conference and play their home games at the Lawrence Joel Veterans Memorial Coliseum. They finished the season 13–20, 2–14 in ACC play to finish in thirteenth place. They advanced to the quarterfinals of the ACC women's tournament where they lost to Duke.

2014–15 media

Wake Forest IMG Sports Network
The Wake Forest Demon Deacons IMG Sports Network will broadcast Hokies games on Wake Forest All Access. You can also keep track on Twitter @WakeWBB. Post game interviews are posted on the schools YouTube Channel.

Roster

Schedule

|-
!colspan=9 style="background:#000000; color:#CBAD71;"|Regular Season

|-
!colspan=9 style="background:#CBAD71;"| 2015 ACC Tournament

Rankings
2014–15 NCAA Division I women's basketball rankings

See also
 Wake Forest Demon Deacons women's basketball

References

Wake Forest Demon Deacons women's basketball seasons
Wake Forest